is a Japanese manga series by Ruri Miyahara, published in Shōnen Gahōsha's seinen manga magazine Young King OURs from the June 2010 issue till the February 2018 issue. It has been collected in eleven tankōbon volumes as of July 2018. An extra fan volume was published in August 2018. An anime television series adaptation produced by Brain's Base aired in Japan between April and June 2014.

Plot
Thanks to his parents' job transfer, high school freshman Kazunari Usa finally gets to enjoy living on his own. His mother makes him stay at Kawai Complex, a boarding house that provides meals for its residents. Ritsu, the senpai he admires, also lives in Kawai Complex, as do a few other "unique" individuals: Shirosaki, his novelist, masochistic roommate; Mayumi, a beautiful, buxom office lady who has terrible luck with men; and Sayaka, a sly and predatory college student. Surrounded by these people, Usa finds his daily life neither peaceful nor boring. As the series progresses, Usa and Ritsu gradually become closer friends, and the pair's feelings for each other grow stronger. After a series of misunderstandings, including Usa's belief that Ritsu has developed feelings for a classmate and her thinking that he is kind to her out of pity rather than genuine caring, the two eventually become a couple towards the end of Usa's second year in high school.

Characters

Kawai Dormitory

 
Usa Kazunari is a high school freshman whose parents had to move away for work. He agrees to stay anywhere, as long as he could live on his own in peace and quiet. 
Having grown up surrounded by his parents' eccentric friends, Usa feels that unique individuals tend to gravitate to him resulting in what he considers a disastrous three years in middle school where he gained a reputation for handling odd people. 
Although he initially balks at the idea of rooming with dysfunctional person, he decides to stay at the Kawai Complex and quickly adjusts to its residents' behaviors. 
His favorite dish is hanbāgu.

 
Ritsu is a second year student at Usa's school and is the second resident that Usa meets. She is the daughter of the legal owner of Kawai Complex; a fact that she often brings up when a resident crosses the line. Often staying in the library where Usa saw her first, she loves reading books and becomes quite oblivious to her surroundings when she is engrossed at it. Painfully reticent, she is often expressionless but is prone to outbursts of emotion when something amuses, moves or embarrasses her. Aside from an avid attraction to traditional clothes, she greatly likes the cream puffs sold at a bakery by the station of which only thirty pieces are for sale each day. Despite her initial disinterest, she gradually grows to rely on Usa and falls in love with him without even realizing it.
In the manga Ritsu is depicted with black hair while in the anime she has brown hair.

 
The manager of Kawai Dormitory and the sister of Ritsu's grandfather. She interviews potential boarders first to determine background and compatibility with the current residents. Wanting to be a perfect side character in a romantic drama, she sometimes practices on Usa by giving observations and comments that are meant to be of no value. 
Rather insightful, she knows just when to serve a resident's favorite dish for dinner.
She keeps a doll collection in her room.

 
Usa's somewhat perverted author roommate. Known for being a masochist, he specializes in bondage and can tie complex knots that are difficult to undo. 
He is good at crafting which he usually employs to while away boredom or make Mayumi feel better.
When outside, he is usually marched off to the police station for being a suspicious character. 
Caught sticking his head through a hole in a fence that surrounded a grade school, he is the third resident that Usa meets. 
His favorite dish is chicken katsu.

 
An office lady who has terrible luck with men, she is the fourth resident that Usa meets. She is always spiteful to everyone, especially those who have found romance or about to find romance. She tends to drink alcohol heavily when depressed and nags when drunk. She is always on the lookout for something to use against Sayaka and considers Miharu a boxful of Sayaka's weaknesses.
She is particularly fond of interfering with Usa and Ritsu's relationship. Though she often expresses displeasure at their budding romance, she seems to be happy for them in her own way. 
Mayumi's favorite dish is oyakodon.

 
A college student staying at Kawai Dormitory. She is the last resident that Usa meets. Sweet on the outside but loves to cause trouble for others, she has a penchant for leading men on. She loves to fondle Mayumi, much to the latter's resentment. She hardly leaves her room without any makeup on and it is implied that her bare face is very different. 
It is revealed later on in the series, during Miharu's visit, a lot is revealed like Sayaka dated both boys and girls with her huge BL (Boy's Love) manga collection not to mention a rabid fear of rabbits.

Others

An elementary school student who becomes attached to the Kawai Dormitory residents after Shirosaki found her wallet during a temporary falling out with her friends. She can be quite frank with her observations and can be unsparing when she speaks her mind. She has a fondness for pudding and, in Shirosaki's point of view, has the makings of a sadist.

Usa's friend at school who has developed a crush on Mayumi after seeing her at the traditional café during a side trip of the mixer. He eventually sets his attentions on another girl from his class.

 / 

Hōjō is one of the first employees Usa meets at his summer part time job. Going by the name Yamamoto at work, he appears to have assumed the "apprentice" character rather seriously and uses lyrical, explanatory notations to emphasize his words.

 / 

Kurokawa is also one of the first employees Usa meets at his summer part time job. Going by the name Saionji, he often speaks of guardian spirits which greatly reminds Usa of Hayashi.

Usa's classmate back in middle school. She had an obsession to things occult and was among those Usa had to handle in middle school. Upon entering high school, she left the occult stuff behind her and underwent a makeover to appear more girly and fashionable. She has lingering feelings for Usa but treats him shabbily when they meet again which she regrets. As the series progresses, she is able to put these feelings aside and befriends Ritsu. She also becomes interested in Kurokawa, seeing in him a connection with her past self. Eventually, she is able to help Ritsu realize that not only are her feelings for Usa more than friendship, but that he also has feelings for her.

Sayaka's classmate back in middle school, Sayaka considers her as the only friend she can handle. Much to Sayaka's chagrin, she often shows up unannounced at the Kawai Complex. And because she knows a lot about how Sayaka behaved in middle school, the other residents often urge her to share the more embarrassing ones.

Ritsu's classmate who befriended her during a temporary falling out with her own friends. In contrast with Ritsu who prefers reading in private, she considers reading a social activity. Although not as avid a fan of reading books as she makes herself out to be, Usa observes that she does genuinely love to read. In fact, it is revealed later that a good number of the class read the Count Bailey novels because of her recommendations. 
Her association with Ritsu, however, does not last long and ends rather abruptly.

Is a middle school student who was caught red-handed by the Kawai Complex residents while vandalizing their wall with graffiti as an outlet for stress and pressure. A picture of when Shirosaki tied him up, to keep him from running away, is often used as a meme. After finding out that Usa and Ritsu are students at his dream high school, he starts to rely on Usa for tips on how to pass the qualifying exams. 
He drops by the dormitory from time to time with Japanese sweets and other food that are usually high in sugar much to Mayumi's frustration. 

Is Mayumi's classmate when still in school. Just as popular and Mayumi's rival in good looks, she is also still unattached and single. Deemed as too independent and successful, her boyfriend decided to call off their engagement. 

Was Mayumi's first boyfriend during high school. They broke up after a year of dating. 

A former resident of Kawai Dormitory who had Sayaka's room before her. She works for a design company in Tokyo. Before she left the dorm she suffered bad luck with work related stuff, including once when Mayumi's boyfriend embezzled money from Mabuchi's coworker. She also has not made a good impression at her new job, which has left her depressed.

Media

Manga
The Kawai Complex Guide to Manors and Hostel Behavior started as a manga series, written and drawn by Ruri Miyahara and published by Shōnen Gahōsha in their Young King OURs seinen manga magazine. The manga is also published online in English by Crunchyroll. The first chapter appeared in the June 2010 issue, released on April 30, 2010. The series has also been compiled in eleven tankōbon volumes, published between May 30, 2011, and July 30, 2018. On August 30, 2018 an additional volume was published. It contained unused illustrations and some new manga along with anime box set illustrations. The manga ended serialization on December 28, 2017 in the February 2018 issue.

Anime
A 12-episode anime television series adaptation, directed by Shigeyuki Miya at studio Brain's Base, aired on TBS from April 3 to June 19, 2014, and later on Sun TV, KBS, CBC, BS-TBS and Kids Station. The series was streamed with English subtitles by Crunchyroll. The anime has been licensed for digital and home video release by Sentai Filmworks. An unaired episode was released with the seventh part of the DVD and Blu-ray Disc release on December 26, 2014.

Episode list

See also
Love Lab, another manga series by Ruri Miyahara.

References

External links
 

Anime series based on manga
Brain's Base
Comedy anime and manga
Seinen manga
Sentai Filmworks
Shōnen Gahōsha manga